The 2013 Lamar Hunt U.S. Open Cup was the 100th edition of the oldest ongoing competition in American soccer. Qualification began in November 2012 in the fifth tier, although the United States Soccer Federation did not announce the format until March 5, 2013.

The defending champions were Sporting Kansas City, who were knocked out of the competition in the fourth round. D.C. United received a $250,000 cash prize and a berth into the 2014–15 CONCACAF Champions League for winning the tournament, while Real Salt Lake received $60,000 for being the runner-up. Three teams received $15,000 for being the top finisher from each lower division - Des Moines Menace (USL PDL), Orlando City (USL Pro), & Carolina RailHawks (NASL).

Qualification 

Two play-in matches were conducted between 2 NPSL teams and the entrants for USCS and SS with the winners entering the first round.

 $: Winner of $15,000 bonus for advancing the furthest in the competition from their respective divisions.
 $$: Winner of $60,000 for being the runner-up in the competition.
 $$$: Winner of $250,000 for winning the competition.

Brackets 
Home team is listed first, winners are in bold.

Schedule

Play-In Round

First round

Second round

Third round

Fourth round 

1 Game was postponed and moved to June 13 due to severe weather.

Quarterfinals

Semifinals

Final

Top Goal Scorers 

Final standings as of October 1, 2013.

See also 
 Lamar Hunt U.S. Open Cup

References

External links 
 The Cup.us – Full Coverage of the Lamar Hunt US Open Cup

 
U.S. Open Cup
United States Open Cup